In the Western world or non-Asian countries, terms such as "racism against Asians" or "anti-Asian racism" is typically meant to include institutional racist policies, discrimination, and mistreatment of Asian people and Asian immigrants by institutions or non-Asian people.

Overview 
The concept of 'racism against Asians' is most common in communities or countries where the ethnic or racial majority is non-Asian, or the national character is Western. The concept is most often employed referring to Anti-Asian phenomena outside of the Asian continent, such as in countries in Africa, Europe, North America and South America.

Countries

Australia 
 White Australia policy

Canada 
 Chinese head tax in Canada
 Chinese Immigration Act, 1885
 Royal Commission on Chinese Immigration
 Internment of Japanese Canadians
 Pacific Coast race riots of 1907
 1886 Vancouver anti-Chinese riots
 Anti-Oriental riots (Vancouver)
 Chinese Immigration Act, 1923

Uganda 
 Expulsion of Asians from Uganda

United States 
 Racism against Asian Americans, covers the history of anti-Asian racism in the United States
 Anti-Chinese legislation in the United States
Los Angeles Chinese massacre of 1871
San Francisco riot of 1877
Destruction of Chinatown, Denver
Tacoma riot of 1885
Seattle riot of 1886
Chinese Massacre Cove
Pacific Coast race riots of 1907
Rock Springs massacre
Chinese Exclusion Act
 Immigration Act of 1924
 Internment of Japanese Americans
 Stop Asian Hate, a 2021 movement in the United States

Against East and Southeast Asians 

 Anti-Chinese sentiment in the United States
 Anti-Japanese sentiment in the United States
 Interminority racism in the United States (by Black Americans against Asian Americans)

France 
 Anti-Asian racism in France

See also 
 Anti-Chinese sentiment
 Anti-Indian sentiment
 Anti-Japanese sentiment
 Anti-Filipino sentiment
 Anti-Indonesian sentiment
 Anti-Khmer sentiment
 Anti-Korean sentiment
 Anti-Vietnamese sentiment

References

Anti–East Asian sentiment
Anti–South Asian sentiment
Anti–Southeast Asian sentiment
Anti-national sentiment
Stereotypes of East Asian people
Racism